Yosemite is an unincorporated community in eastern Casey County, Kentucky, United States. Their Post Office was closed in September 2011. It was established in the 1870s for logging facilities owned  by Cincinnati businessman Eugene Zimmerman. It was named by his daughter Helena, who said the hilly area reminded her of the Yosemite valley in California. 

Locals in the area pronounce the town "YO-see-MITE", differing from the California pronunciation.

References

Unincorporated communities in Casey County, Kentucky
Unincorporated communities in Kentucky